The Norfolk Senior Cup (currently known as the Ashtons Legal Senior Cup for sponsorship reasons) is a football cup competition for clubs in the county of Norfolk, England, who compete between steps three and seven of the non-League pyramid. The first competition for this cup was held in the 1881–82 season.

Format

In 2011–12 there were four rounds prior to the quarter-finals.

The final is hosted at Carrow Road, home of Norwich City.

List of finals

References

County Cup competitions
Football in Norfolk